Children's Grand Park Station is a rapid transit station  on Seoul Subway Line 7. It is located in Mojin-dong in the Gwangjin-gu administrative district of Seoul. It is also adjacent to Children's Grand Park from which it takes its name. The underground platform has side platforms. The station has connections to ten bus lines through its six exits. It services Gunja-dong, Hwayang-dong, Neung-dong and Mojin-Dong. The northern exits of the station are flanked by Sejong University, Children's Grand Park and some small commercial development, while the southern exits open onto mixed commercial and residential development in Hwayang-dong.

Station layout

History
Children's Grand Park Station was opened on October 11, 1996 as part of the original part of Line 7 which ran from Jangam Station to Konkuk University Station. Line 7 was completed on August 1, 2000.

Average Daily Ridership

References

Railway stations opened in 1996
Seoul Metropolitan Subway stations
Metro stations in Gwangjin District